The Cotton Futures Act of 1916 required the principal, meaning the exact type and grade of cotton, be given to the government upon sale at a cotton exchange, so that the USDA could keep track of what was being grown and where. It replaced the Cotton Futures Act of 1914, which was ruled unconstitutional. 

United States federal commodity and futures legislation
United States federal agriculture legislation
Cotton industry in the United States